Joseph Ward may refer to:

Joseph Ward (1838–1889), South Dakota politician
Joseph Ward (Beghé), a 1963 marble sculpture
Joseph Ward (1856–1930), Prime minister of New Zealand
Joseph Ward (astronomer) (1862–1927), New Zealand farmworker, bookseller and astronomer
Joseph Ward (fencer) (1909–1970), New Zealand fencer and fencing administrator
Joseph Ward (Marlborough politician) (1817–1892), New Zealand politician
Joseph Ward (tenor) (1932–2019), English tenor (formerly baritone) 
Joseph Ward (VC) (1832–1872), Victoria Cross recipient
Joseph D. Ward (1914–2003), Massachusetts politician
Joseph P. Ward, historian

See also
Joe Ward (disambiguation)